Jackson Rondinelli (born 20 May 1994) is a Brazilian diver. He competed in the men's synchronized ten metre platform event at the 2016 Summer Olympics.
He started diving at the age of 15 in São Paulo, and had his first competition as a national open in 2010.

References

External links
 

1994 births
Living people
Brazilian male divers
Olympic divers of Brazil
Divers at the 2016 Summer Olympics
Place of birth missing (living people)
Divers at the 2015 Pan American Games
Pan American Games competitors for Brazil
21st-century Brazilian people